Piste may refer to:

 Piste, a marked ski-run or path down a mountain
 Piste (fencing), the narrow strip along which the sport of fencing is played
 Piste (pétanque), the strip along which the sport of pétanque is played

Locations
 Pisté, Yucatán, a village in Mexico.
 Pisti, also spelled Piste, a mountain in Peru